Jeffrey Larmer (born November 10, 1962) is a Canadian former professional ice hockey player who played 158 games in the National Hockey League. He played with the Colorado Rockies, New Jersey Devils and the Chicago Black Hawks.

Larmer was born in Peterborough, Ontario. As a youth, he played in the 1975 Quebec International Pee-Wee Hockey Tournament with a minor ice hockey team from Peterborough. Larmer holds the record for most points in a Memorial Cup, having scored 16 points in the 1982 Memorial Cup. The record was tied by Guy Rouleau in 1986.

He is the younger brother of the former NHL star Steve Larmer.

Career statistics

References

External links

1962 births
Living people
Canadian ice hockey left wingers
Chicago Blackhawks players
Colorado Rockies (NHL) draft picks
Colorado Rockies (NHL) players
HC Davos players
Ice hockey people from Ontario
Kitchener Rangers players
Milwaukee Admirals (IHL) players
New Jersey Devils players
Nova Scotia Oilers players
Solihull Barons players
Sportspeople from Peterborough, Ontario
Wichita Wind players
Canadian expatriate ice hockey players in Switzerland